Francisco García Moreno (born 1 June 1947 in Mexico City, died 26 March 2016 in Cuernavaca) was a Mexican Olympic water polo player (1968, 1972, 1976), and a former coach of the national team.

El Panchote, as Garcia Moreno was known, was a member of the bronze medal winning teams at the 1967 and 1971 Pan American Games and a member of the gold medal winning team at the 1975 Pan American Games. Garcia Moreno owned a gym in Cuernavaca where he specialized in teaching babies and children to swim. He promoted water polo among young people in the area. He was murdered during a robbery attempt near his home in Tlatenango, Cuernavaca in 2016. He was always surrounded by other athletes such as Felipe Tibio Muñoz.

See also
 List of people from Morelos, Mexico

References

External links

1947 births
2016 deaths
Mexican male water polo players
Sportspeople from Mexico City
Olympic water polo players of Mexico
Water polo players at the 1968 Summer Olympics
Water polo players at the 1972 Summer Olympics
Water polo players at the 1976 Summer Olympics
Pan American Games gold medalists for Mexico
Pan American Games bronze medalists for Mexico
Pan American Games medalists in water polo
Male murder victims
Mexican murder victims
People murdered in Mexico
Deaths by firearm in Mexico
Water polo players at the 1967 Pan American Games
Water polo players at the 1971 Pan American Games
Water polo players at the 1975 Pan American Games
Medalists at the 1967 Pan American Games
Medalists at the 1971 Pan American Games
Medalists at the 1975 Pan American Games
20th-century Mexican people